Enrique Ricardo Murciano  (born July 9, 1973) is an American actor. He is known for his role as FBI agent Danny Taylor in the CBS mystery drama series Without a Trace from 2002 to 2009.

Early life and education
Born and raised in Miami, Florida, Murciano attended Christopher Columbus High School and then Tulane University in New Orleans, Louisiana. He originally studied at New England School of Law in Boston for a time, but ultimately decided to pursue an acting career and left. He moved to Los Angeles, and began his career, making his feature film debut in the 1997 action film Speed 2: Cruise Control, which starred Sandra Bullock.

Career
In 2000, Murciano appeared in the crime drama Traffic. In 2001, he starred as Francesco Torres in the short-lived MTV soap opera Spyder Games. That same year, he appeared in war thriller Black Hawk Down. It was there that he met Jerry Bruckheimer, leading to him being offered a starring role as Danny Taylor in the CBS mystery drama Without a Trace. The series centered around a missing persons unit of the FBI in New York City. The show ran for seven seasons from September 26, 2002 to May 19, 2009. This role earned him two nominations from the ALMA Award in 2008 and in 2009.

His additional film credits include the comedy Miss Congeniality 2: Armed and Fabulous (his second film with Sandra Bullock), the drama How to Go Out on a Date in Queens, the drama The Lost City and the Peruvian-Spanish drama Máncora. He also appeared in the music video "Yes We Can" by will.i.am and in the video directed by Demi Moore "Presidential Pledge".

In October 2009, Murciano appeared in the CBS police procedural drama CSI: Crime Scene Investigation in season 10: episode 4 titled "Coup de Gráce" (French for "stroke of mercy"), as Det. Carlos Moreno from the LVPD Vice Division.

In April 2011, Murciano had a recurring role in the CBS police procedural drama NCIS, as CIA Agent Ray "CI-Ray" Cruz appearing in season 8: episode 20 titled "Two-Faced" and the eighth-season finale titled "Pyramid". In January 2012, he made his final appearance on the show in season 9: episode 13 titled "A Desperate Man".

In April 2012, Murciano returned to CSI: Crime Scene Investigation reprising his role of Det. Carlos Moreno, appearing in season 12: episode 20 titled "Altered Stakes", the twelfth-season finale titled "Homecoming", the thirteenth-season premiere titled "Karma to Burn" and season 13: episode 3 titled "Wild Flowers".

In October 2012, Murciano had a recurring role in the short-lived ABC supernatural/horror drama 666 Park Avenue, as Dr. Scott Evans, appearing in the fifth episode titled "A Crowd of Demons", the sixth episode titled "Diabolic" and the seventh episode titled "Downward Spiral".

Murciano co-starred as Kemp in the 3-D science fiction film Dawn of the Planet of the Apes, the 2014 sequel to Rise of the Planet of the Apes. From 2014 to 2016, he played Felipe Lobos in the Starz series Power.

In 2015, Murciano began a
role as a series regular as Det. Marco Diaz  on the Netflix original series Bloodline.

In 2017, Murciano had a supporting role in the Netflix original film Bright as a gang leader named "Poison".

Personal life
Murciano is of Cuban descent, and speaks fluent Spanish as shown in Without a Trace in season 4: episode 6 titled "Viuda Negra" (Spanish for "black widow").

In 2006, People magazine ranked him number seven in its annual list of "The Sexiest Men Alive".

Good friends with Jimmy Buffett as Jimmy discussed his 2020 Album "Life On The Flip side" on the Jonathon Brandmeier Podcast #15.

Filmography

Film

Television

References

External links
 

1973 births
20th-century American male actors
21st-century American male actors
American entertainers of Cuban descent
American male film actors
American male television actors
Hispanic and Latino American male actors
Living people
Male actors from Miami
Tulane University alumni
Christopher Columbus High School (Miami-Dade County, Florida) alumni